Rodrigo Melo may refer to:

 Rodrigo Melo (footballer, born 1982), Brazilian defender
 Rodrigo Melo (footballer, born 1995), Argentine midfielder